Gymnote (S655) was an experimental submarine of the French Navy. She was a trials submarine for submarine-launched ballistic missiles (SLBM) and powered by diesel electric engines.

The French planned a nuclear propelled submarine in the late 1950s and laid down a hull (no Q244). Because France had not developed uranium enrichment facilities at the time, the planned power plant was to be a heavy water reactor, which could utilize natural uranium.  But French engineers were unable to produce a reactor small enough to fit into the submarine, which led to the project being canceled in 1959.

In the early 1960s the French government decided to develop an independent nuclear deterrent based on SLBM's. Hull Q244 was redesigned as a trials submarine with diesel-electric propulsion and four missile tubes in an extended casing. Re-designated Q251 and christened Gymnote, she was commissioned in 1966 and fired the first M-1 missile in 1968. The M-1 missile was subsequently deployed aboard the  submarines. She was extensively rebuilt in 1977-79 to enable trials of the new M-4 missile. In the 1980s, as part of a general re-numbering of the French submarine fleet, Gymnote was re-designated S655.

Gymnote was decommissioned in 1986.

See also

List of submarines of France

References

Citations

Sources
  Also published as 

Submarines of the French Navy
Ships built in France
1964 ships
Cold War submarines of France